Cardamine amara, known as large bitter-cress, is a species of flowering plant in the family Brassicaceae. It is found in damp places.

References

amara
Plants described in 1753
Taxa named by Carl Linnaeus